Henrique de Meneses, 3rd Marquis of Louriçal, 7th Count of Ericeira (5 January 1727 - 29 May 1787), was a Portuguese nobleman and statesman.

Career 
Envoy Extraordinary and Minister Plenipotentiary to Turin and Rome. He was ambassador to Madrid, in 1785, where he was in charge of negotiating treaties marriage between Infante João of Portugal to Carlota Joaquina of Spain and Infanta Mariana Victoria of Portugal and Infante Gabriel of Spain.

He succeeded his brother in the house, D. Rafael Francisco Xavier de Menezes.

Family 
He married his niece, the daughter of a sister, D. Maria da Glória da Cunha e Menezes.

He had two illegitimate sons by D. Maria Antonia Pinto de Sousa Albuquerque Nussane.

1727 births
1787 deaths
Portuguese nobility
Ambassadors of Portugal to Spain